Vaughn Ross (September 4, 1971 – July 18, 2013) was a Texas murderer. He was a graduate student at Texas Tech University before being convicted for the January 31, 2001, murders of Douglas Birdsall, 53, and Viola Ross McVade, 18, in Lubbock County, Texas.

Background 
Viola was the sister of Ross's girlfriend. Douglas Birdsall had been the associate dean at the Texas Tech library. Ross shot both victims. Later the same day, a mountain biker came across the murder scene and found both Douglas's and Viola's bodies in a car. DNA on a latex glove found in Birdsall's car and a sweatshirt Vaughn was wearing had blood of Douglas Birdsall; these were two things that linked Ross to the double murder. In 2002, Ross was found guilty of capital murder and sentenced to death by lethal injection by a jury.

Ross received attention in Sweden after he agreed to be part of a special theme week about the death penalty in the Swedish newspaper Aftonbladet. Aftonbladet covered his case and his last week alive before his execution and reported live from outside the prison on the day of the execution.

Ross left a final statement before being executed which was revealed to Aftonbladet reporter Carina Bergfeldt. He is buried at Captain Joe Byrd Cemetery.

See also 

 Capital punishment in Texas
 List of people executed in Texas, 2010–2019
 List of people executed in the United States in 2013

References 

1971 births
2001 murders in the United States
2013 deaths
21st-century executions by Texas
American people convicted of murder
People convicted of murder by Texas
People executed by Texas by lethal injection
People executed for murder
People from St. Louis County, Missouri
Texas Tech University alumni